Carlo Petrini (born 22 June 1949) is an Italian activist and author and founder of the International Slow Food Movement. 

Petrini was born in the commune of Bra, province of Cuneo, Italy. He was formerly a political activist in the communist Proletarian Unity Party (Partito di Unità Proletaria; PdUP). In 1977, he began contributing culinary articles to the communist daily newspapers il manifesto and l'Unità.

He first came to prominence in the 1980s for taking part in a campaign against the fast food chain McDonald's opening near the Spanish Steps in Rome. In 1983, he helped to create and develop the Italian non-profit food and wine association known as Arcigola. He founded Slow Food in 1986 and became the organization's president.

He is an editor of multiple publications at the publishing house Slow Food Editore. He has written weekly columns for La Stampa and is currently a regular journalist on La Repubblica. In October 2004, he founded the University of Gastronomic Sciences, a university devoted to new gastronomists and innovators of sustainable food systems. 

He is now a supporter and member of the Italian Democratic Party (center-left wing).
Petrini was proposed for politician roles (as Minister).

Carlo Petrini has received numerous awards and acknowledgments including: Communicator of the Year at the International Wine and Spirit Competition in London; Sicco Mansholt Prize in the Netherlands; honorary degree in cultural anthropology from the University of New Hampshire; and Eckart Witzigmann Science and Media Prize from Germany. In 2004 he was chosen as one of Time magazine's heroes of the year. He was the recipient of the Lifetime Achievement Award (Champions of the Earth) in 2013.

See also

Michael Pollan
Luigi Veronelli

References

Bibliography

https://web.archive.org/web/20090428215643/http://www.practicallyedible.com/edible.nsf/pages/slowfood
Slow Food Nation: Why Our Food Should Be Good, Clean, and Fair, Rizzoli, May 2007, 
Slow Food Revolution: A New Culture for Dining and Living in conversation with Gigi Padovani, Rizzoli, September 2006, 
Slow Food: The Case for Taste (Arts & Traditions of the Table: Perspectives on Culinary History), Columbia University Press, April 2003, 
 Slow Food Nation, a speech at Princeton University, 17 May 2007.

External links
Time Heroes 2004
 Carlo Petrini: The slow food star , The Independent, Allison Roberts, December 2006
Slow Food guru spreads gospel in high places, The Observer, Jasper Gerard, June 17, 2007
2006 Speech (simultaneously translated) from the Environmental Grantmakers Association, Fall Retreat Keynote
, San Francisco, October 2005

1949 births
Living people
People from Bra, Piedmont
Italian activists
Italian columnists
Italian male writers
Italian communists
Italian ecologists
La Repubblica people
Recipients of the European Citizen's Prize